Phenacogrammus urotaenia is a species of fish in the African tetra family. It is endemic to the Ntem and Ogowe River basins in Gabon and Cameroon, Africa.

References

Paugy, D. and S.A. Schaefer, 2007. Alestidae. p. 347-411. In M.L.J. Stiassny, G.G. Teugels and C.D. Hopkins (eds.) Poissons d'eaux douces et saumâtres de basse Guinée, ouest de l'Afrique centrale/The fresh and brackish water fishes of Lower Guinea, west-central Africa. Vol. 1. Coll. Faune et Flore tropicales 42. Istitut de recherche pour le développement, Paris, France, Muséum nationale d'histoire naturelle, Paris, France and Musée royale de l'Afrique centrale, Tervuren, Belgique. 800 p.

Alestidae
Freshwater fish of Africa
Taxa named by George Albert Boulenger
Fish described in 1909